Grant is a 2020 American television miniseries directed by Malcolm Venville. Based on the bestselling 2017 non-fiction book by Ron Chernow, the three-part miniseries chronicles the life of Ulysses S. Grant, the eighteenth President of the United States, and premiered on May 25, 2020 on History.

Main cast
Justin Salinger as Ulysses S. Grant 
Carel Nel as Abraham Lincoln
Dianne Simpson as Julia Grant
Craig Jackson as General Henry Halleck
Francis Chouler as John Rawlins
Jason K. Ralph as General William Sherman
Brian Heydenrych as Robert E. Lee
Daniel Fox as Colonel Charles Marshall
Arthur Falko as Young Sentinel (Shiloh)
General Andrew Jackson
Darron Araujo as Mark Twain

Episodes

See also
 Ulysses S. Grant (2002 documentary)
 Washington (2020 History Channel miniseries)
 Abraham Lincoln (2022 History Channel miniseries)
 Theodore Roosevelt (2022 History Channel miniseries)

References

External links

2020s American television miniseries
American drama television films
Cultural depictions of Abraham Lincoln
Cultural depictions of Ulysses S. Grant
Historical television series
Television series about the American Civil War
Television series based on actual events
Television series set in the 19th century
Cultural depictions of Robert E. Lee
Television shows based on biographies
Films directed by Malcolm Venville